Strange News from Mars is an album by Norwegian guitarist Jon Larsen.

Review 
Larsen is a Norwegian string swing guitar virtuoso, and not the one we would suspect to record music inspired by Frank Zappa. This production is noteworthy for the way it accurately resembles the more jazzy excursions of Zappa, as well as for the fact that former Mothers of Invention members Tommy Mars, Bruce Fowler, Arthur Barrow and Jimmy Carl Black appear on it. In fact Barrow engineered the recording and Mars plays keyboards throughout, with Fowler adding some delicious trombone. Black primarily provides humorous interludes (like the «First Indian on Mars»), but the most interesting is how Larsen's core band including Ole Morten Vågan (bass), Håkon Mjåset Johansen (drums), Knut Reiersrud (guitar), and Rob Waring (marimba), are effectively referencing from and building on the Zappa oeuvre. Tracks like "Mutant Fromage", "The Secret Word for Today", "Conceptual Continuity on the Red Planet", to name some, share more than bizarre titles with the work of Zappa. Surprising time changes, strange changes, extended vamps, jumpy bursts of marimba, comedic interjections and Zappa-inspired textures will be familiar to those who recall the late composer's less-prickly (though no less creative) side. Tracks like "A Windy Day on Mars" and the reggae-tinged "Capt. Zurcon's Cranberry Cocktail" feature Larsen attempting to merge his Django-influenced guitar style with Zappa's modal blues improvisational guitar sound with brilliant results.

Reception 
The review by the Allmusic.com awarded the album 3.5 stars, and the review by the Norwegian newspaper Verdens Gang awarded the album 5 stars (dice).

Track listing 
 Goodbye to Earth (1:18)
 The Eons Are Closing (2:44)
 Mutant Fromage (3:34)
 Dachs Reduction (6:21)
 A Windy Day on Mars (0:52)
 Air Sculpting in Vacuum (3:24)
 Strange News from Mars (0:16)
 Cydonian Music (3:29)
 Mars Under the Radar (0:20)
 Cinderella on the Event Horizon of a Black Hole (2:12)
 The Quilt (0:33)
 The Secret Word for Today (2:40)
 Conseptual Continuity on the Red Planet (2:34)
 Norwegisher Schweinhund (0:20)
 Capt. Zurcon's Cranberry Cocktail (2:11)
 Unwanted Sexual Attention in Space (0:30)
 Optional Entertainment in Zero Gravitation (2:16)
 Tax the Churches (0:32)
 Music Is the Best (3:47)
 [Untitled Hidden Track] (2:12)

Personnel 
 Jon Larsen – guitar
 Tommy Mars – keyboards
 Rob Waring – marimba
 Knut Reiersrud – harmonica, guitar
 Ole Morten Vågan – double bass
 Håkon Mjåset Johansen – drums
 Jimmy Carl Black – vocals, percussion

Credits 
Compositions & lyrics by Jon Larsen
Engineered & mixed by Anders Svinndal

References 

Jon Larsen albums
2007 albums